Bill Hounslea (15 August 1926 - March 2013) is a footballer who played as a full back in the Football League for New Brighton and Chester.

References

1926 births
2013 deaths
Footballers from Liverpool
Association football fullbacks
English footballers
New Brighton A.F.C. players
Chester City F.C. players
Winsford United F.C. players
English Football League players